In mathematics, Kummer's congruences are some congruences involving Bernoulli numbers, found by .

 used Kummer's congruences to define the p-adic zeta function.

Statement

The simplest form of Kummer's congruence states that

where p is a prime, h and k are positive even integers not divisible by p−1 and the numbers Bh are Bernoulli numbers.

More generally if h and k are positive even integers not divisible by  p − 1, then

whenever

where φ(pa+1) is the Euler totient function, evaluated at pa+1 and a is a non negative integer. At a = 0, the expression takes the simpler form, as seen above.
The two sides of the Kummer congruence are essentially values of the p-adic zeta function, and the Kummer congruences imply that the p-adic zeta function for negative integers is continuous, so can be extended by continuity to all p-adic integers.

See also

Von Staudt–Clausen theorem, another congruence involving Bernoulli numbers

References

Theorems in number theory
Modular arithmetic